Hard 2 Love may refer to:
Hard 2 Love (Haystak album), 2008, or its title track
Hard 2 Love (Lee Brice album), 2012, or its title track